The Gayer-Anderson Cat is an ancient Egyptian statue of a cat, which dates from the Late Period (around 664–332 BC). It is made of bronze, with gold ornaments.

Style and detail

The sculpture is known as the Gayer-Anderson cat after Major Robert Grenville Gayer-Anderson who, together with Mary Stout Shaw, donated it to the British Museum. The statue is a representation of the female cat deity Bastet. The cat wears jewellery and a protective wedjat amulet. The earrings and nose ring on the statue may not have always belonged to the cat. A scarab appears on the head and a winged scarab is shown on the chest. The statue is 42 cm high and 13 cm wide. A copy of the statue is kept in the Gayer-Anderson Museum, located in Cairo.

Construction

The statue is not as well preserved as it appears. X-rays taken of the sculpture reveal that there are cracks that extend almost completely around the centre of the cat's body, and only an internal system of strengthening prevents the cat's head from falling off. The repairs to the cat were carried out by Major Gayer-Anderson, who was a keen restorer of antiquities in the 1930s. When he bought it, the surface of the cat was "covered with a heavy coating of crystalline verdigris and crisp flakes of red patina" which he carefully chipped away.

The cat was manufactured by the lost wax method, where a wax model is covered with clay and fired in a kiln until the wax flows out, and the hollow mould is refilled with molten metal. In this case the metal was 85% copper, 13% tin, 2% arsenic with a 0.2% trace of lead. The remains of the pins that held the wax core can still be seen using X-rays. The original metalworkers would have been able to create a range of colours on a bronze casting and the stripes on the tail are due to metal of a differing composition. It is also considered likely that the eyes contained stone or glass decorations.

References

Further reading
Clutton-Brock, J. The British Museum book of Cat. London: The British Museum Press, 2000.
 Warner, Nicholas. Guide to the Gayer-Anderson Museum, Cairo. Cairo: Press of the Supreme Council of Antiquities, 2003.  
 Foxcroft, Louise.Gayer-Anderson: The Life and Afterlife of The Irish Pasha. London: Unbound, 2016.
 

Ancient Egyptian sculptures in the British Museum
Sculptures of ancient Egypt
Cats in art
Bronze sculptures in the United Kingdom